Marlise Nicole Muñoz (August 20, 1980 – November 28, 2013) was an American woman at the center of a medical ethics controversy between November 2013 and January 2014. She suffered a suspected pulmonary embolism and was declared brain dead. Because she was pregnant, doctors at a Texas hospital kept her body on a ventilator in the intensive care unit despite the determination of brain death. Muñoz's husband entered a legal battle to have her removed from organ support. A Texas law restricts the application of advance directives in pregnant patients, but Muñoz's husband argued that the law was not applicable because his wife was legally dead. A judge ordered the hospital to remove organ support and her cardiac functions stopped on January 26, 2014.

Background
On November 26, Erick Muñoz found his 33-year-old wife unconscious in their family home and rushed her to John Peter Smith Hospital. The cause of her condition was speculated to be a pulmonary embolism. At the hospital it was also established that she was 14 weeks pregnant. According to the hospital's lawyers, Marlise had been brain dead since November 28. In Texas, brain death is considered the legal definition of death.

Marlise, a paramedic like her husband, had previously told him that in case of brain death, she would not want to be kept alive artificially.  While she had been declared dead, the condition of her fetus was unknown. It was unclear whether the fetus sustained any injuries from her fall or the intervening time period before her body was stabilized at the hospital.

Legal battle
Erick Muñoz petitioned for Marlise to be removed from all life-sustaining measures once brain death had been declared. The hospital refused, citing a Texas law which required that lifesaving measures be maintained if a female patient was pregnant—even if there was written documentation that this was against the wishes of the patient or the next of kin. Erick Muñoz filed suit in state court.

In January 2014, Erick Muñoz's attorneys argued that the fetus had severe abnormalities caused by oxygen deprivation, and was likely non-viable. The fetus had fluid building up inside the skull (hydrocephalus) and possibly had a heart problem. The attorneys also argued that the fetus' lower extremities were deformed to the extent that the sex could not be determined. An attorney who had helped rewrite the Texas state law cited as the reasoning for maintaining life support said that there was a problem with the application of the law to a patient that was no longer alive.

On January 24, 2014, Judge R. H. Wallace Jr. ruled that the hospital must disconnect Muñoz's organ support by January 27. The judge did not rule on the constitutionality of the state law but instead found that the law did not apply to deceased patients like Muñoz.

Numerous states have adopted laws restricting the ability of doctors to end artificial life support for terminally ill pregnant patients. Twelve of those states (including Texas) have the most restrictive of such laws, which automatically invalidate a woman's advance directive if she is pregnant. Such laws state that, regardless of the progression of the pregnancy, a woman must remain on life-sustaining treatment until she gives birth.

Marlise Muñoz was disconnected from organ support at 11:30 AM on January 26, 2014. All remaining respiratory function ceased immediately and all cardiac function ended a few minutes later. Her body was released to her family. Erick Muñoz decided to name the fetus Nicole, his wife's middle name.

See also
Death of Savita Halappanavar
Jahi McMath case
Maternal somatic support after brain death

References

External links
 Texas Advance Directives Act. Sec. 166.049 and Sec. 166.098 cover pregnant patients.

2013 deaths
2014 in Texas
Anti-abortion movement
Deaths by person in Texas
Medical controversies in the United States
People with severe brain damage